The 1992 NASCAR Winston Cup Series was the 44th season of professional stock car racing in the United States and the 21st modern-era Cup season. The season began on February 9, 1992, and ended on November 15, 1992. Independent owner/driver Alan Kulwicki of AK Racing won the Winston Cup championship.

The Generation 4 car was introduced this season, when body panels were removed, teams spent hours in a wind tunnel to gain aerodynamics, the led shot was replaced by the led ingot, the fuel mileage was cut for the drivers to lead more laps, and the bumpers, nose, and tail were composed to mullet fiber glass.

The 1992 season was considered one of the most dramatic and emotional years in NASCAR. The seven-time champion, and "King of stock car racing," Richard Petty retired from the sport at the season's end, concluding a year-long "Fan Appreciation Tour." Petty appeared across the country for autographs and diecasts were made of his No. 43 car for all 29 of the races he appeared in. The season also saw the quiet debut of a future champion Jeff Gordon, who was planning to move up after two seasons in the Busch Series. Gordon debuted the rainbow No. 24 Chevrolet at the final race of the year.

The season-long championship battle narrowed down to six drivers, the most ever going into the final race of the season. Davey Allison won the season-opening Daytona 500, and despite a roller-coaster season, remained first, or near the top of the standings all season. Bill Elliott and Alan Kulwicki experienced more consistent results, placing them comfortably near the top. Harry Gant, Mark Martin and Kyle Petty were also factors during the season. Two-time defending champion Dale Earnhardt, however, suffered a dismal season, winning only one race, dropping out several times, and finished outside the top ten at season's end, for just the second time in his Cup career.

The season's climax occurred at the final race of the season, the Hooters 500 at Atlanta. Six drivers entered the race with a mathematical chance at winning the Winston Cup championship. Davey Allison led the charge, but ultimately fell short when he was involved in an accident. The race and the championship came down to a two-man battle between Bill Elliott and Alan Kulwicki. Elliott won the race, while Kulwicki finished second. Kulwicki led 103 laps during the race (compared to 102 by Elliott), clinched the 5 bonus points for leading the most laps, and won the Winston Cup title.

Tragically, only months later, both Alan Kulwicki and Davey Allison would be killed in separate aviation crashes.

The 1992 season was also the final year of Oldsmobile as a manufacturer in the series. The 1992 season was also the first Manufacturers' championship for Ford since 1969. Ford swept the top three in points snapping GM's streak of 16 straight manufacturers' championships (between Chevrolet and Buick).

Teams and drivers

Complete schedule

Limited schedule

Schedule

Races

Busch Clash 

The Busch Clash, an exhibition event for all 1991 Busch Pole winners, and one "wild card" (from the fastest second round qualifiers from 1991) consisted of a 15-car field. The event was held Saturday, February 9 at Daytona International Speedway, a slight change from previous seasons, which usually saw the race held on Sunday. The move was made at the request of CBS, who wanted the additional time on Sunday for their coverage of the 1992 Winter Olympics.

Brett Bodine drew the pole.

The race consisted of two 10-lap "sprint" segments, separated by a competition yellow, during which the field would be inverted.
Sterling Marlin won the first 10-lap segment, and Geoff Bodine won the second 10-lap segment, to claim the overall victory.
Except for the 2-lap competition yellow, the race otherwise was completed caution-free.

Gatorade 125s 
Sterling Marlin won the pole for the Daytona 500 during time trials on Sunday, February 9. His Junior Johnson teammate Bill Elliott qualified second to take the "outside pole."

The Gatorade 125-mile qualifying races for the Daytona 500 were held Thursday, February 13 at Daytona International Speedway. Sterling Marlin and Bill Elliott started first in each of the races, respectively.

During the second race, a crash on lap 4 took out several cars, including Alan Kulwicki, Terry Labonte and A. J. Foyt. Richard Petty also wrecked out on lap 8. All four would qualify for the Daytona 500 based on speed or by provisional.

34th Daytona 500 by STP 
The Daytona 500 by STP was held on February 16 at Daytona International Speedway. Sterling Marlin won the pole.

Junior Johnson's stablemates, Bill Elliott and Sterling Marlin, controlled the front row, qualifying 1st–2nd, and leading 58 of the first 91 laps.
On lap 92, Elliott, Marlin, and Ernie Irvan went three wide coming out of turn two. Marlin, sandwiched in the middle, bounced off both his teammate and Irvan, and all three lost control in front of the entire field, triggering the "Big One". In all, 14 cars were eliminated from the event. Richard Petty, in his final Daytona 500, was among the cars spinning to the infield grass, but he was not heavily damaged, and was able to continue.
Davey Allison and Morgan Shepherd were among the few cars who slipped by unscathed. Allison led 95 of the final 100 laps to claim his first Daytona 500 victory, following in the footsteps of his father Bobby. Shepherd was a surprise second, while Geoff Bodine was third. Michael Waltrip also notably slipped by unscathed, but engine trouble late in the race took him out of contention. 
Alan Kulwicki started 41st after a crash in the Twin 125s qualifying race. He was running in the top ten when the "Big One" occurred. He spun out into the grass, but did not suffer any significant damage. He returned to the track and ran as high as second. In the closing laps, he was running third, just ahead of Geoff Bodine. On the final lap, while Allison and Shepherd were battling for the lead, Bodine got by Kulwicki down the backstretch and into turn three. Bodine snatched third, and Kulwicki came home fourth.
This would be the final Daytona 500 start for both Richard Petty and A. J. Foyt.
Three weeks removed from leading Washington to victory in Super Bowl XXVI; Joe Gibbs made his debut as a car owner, with his car finishing 36th after being collected in the aforementioned "Big One" on lap 92.

GM Goodwrench 500 
The GM Goodwrench 500 was held March 1 at Rockingham. The #42 of Kyle Petty won the pole.

Top ten results

 11-Bill Elliott
 28-Davey Allison
 33-Harry Gant
 30-Michael Waltrip, 1 lap down
 25-Ken Schrader, 1 lap down
 6-Mark Martin, 2 laps down
 94-Terry Labonte, 2 laps down
 26-Brett Bodine, 2 laps down
 12-Hut Stricklin, 2 laps down
 17-Darrell Waltrip, 2 laps down

Bill Elliott recovered from his crash at Daytona to lead the final 213 laps, and win in only his second start at Junior Johnson Motorsports.
Bill's margin of victory was a whopping 12.75 seconds, nearly half a lap.
Davey Allison followed up his Daytona victory finishing second, and extended his points lead.
Bill Elliott and Davey Allison led a combined 450 of 492 laps. Allison left the weekend 56 points ahead of Morgan Shepherd, who led 1 lap and finished 3 laps down in 13th.
Polesitter Kyle Petty, the two-time defending race and pole position winner, was unable to make it three in a row. The Unocal 76 Challenge bonus money had now rolled over 25 races, and would be $197,600 for the next race.

Pontiac Excitement 400 
The Pontiac Excitement 400 was held March 8 at Richmond International Raceway. Bill Elliott won the pole.

 Bill Elliott won his second consecutive race. Elliott was pushed to the limit by Alan Kulwicki, who made a late charge and nearly pulled off a last-lap pass. The two raced clean on the final lap, and Elliott nipped Kulwicki at the finish line by 18 inches. It was just Elliott's second career win on a short track.
Points leader Davey Allison finished 4th. 
This was Bill Elliott's final win at a short track. He dominated by leading 348 of the 400 laps (87%), but beat Alan Kulwicki by only 18 inches. Davey Allison now led the points standings over Harry Gant by 63 points, and Bill Elliott by 68.
Bill Elliott broke a streak of 25 rollovers, and claimed the Unocal 76 Challenge of $197,600 — the second-highest total awarded in the history of the program.

Motorcraft Quality Parts 500 

The Motorcraft Quality Parts 500 was held March 15 at Atlanta Motor Speedway.  The #6 of Mark Martin won the pole. 

Top ten results

 11-Bill Elliott
 33-Harry Gant
 3-Dale Earnhardt
 28-Davey Allison
 8-Dick Trickle
 15-Geoff Bodine
 7-Alan Kulwicki
 42-Kyle Petty
 94-Terry Labonte
 21-Morgan Shepherd

Due to injuries Ernie Irvan sustained in the previous day's Busch Series race, Irvan in the opening laps was forced to turn his car over to future NASCAR Cup Series champion Bobby Labonte.
Late in the race, it appeared that hometown favorite Bill Elliott would not be victorious on this day. The team had missed on the set-up and he was mired near 15th most of the day. Late in the race, leaders Allison, Kulwicki, and Gant pitted under green for what would be their final scheduled pit stop of the day. Every car on the lead lap had pitted for tires and fuel, except Elliott, whose Budweiser Ford has been enjoying good fuel mileage. Suddenly, Mike Wallace spun in turn two, bringing out a caution with 40 laps to go. Elliott was on a lap by himself because everyone else had already made a green-flag pit stop. At the time there was no "wave around" or Beneficiary rule. Elliott pitted under the caution and was able to keep the lead, returning to the track in the middle of the pack, but still scored as the leader. On the restart, second place Gant led the pack with third place Allison right behind - but both were nearly a full lap behind leader Elliott. Elliott was able to cruise over the final laps to an 18-second win over Harry Gant. It was Elliott's third straight victory, and at the end of the day Elliott and Gant were tied for second in points, 58 behind Davey Allison. Perhaps crew chief Tim Brewer said it best when he quipped, "Maybe we should have backed into Victory Lane, that's sure how we got here!". Elliott himself said "they gimme that race!" Earnhardt, Allison and Trickle rounded out the top five.

TranSouth 500 
The TranSouth 500 was held March 29 at Darlington Raceway.  The #22 of Sterling Marlin won the pole. 

Top ten results
 11-Bill Elliott
 33-Harry Gant
 6-Mark Martin
 28-Davey Allison, 1 lap down
 5-Ricky Rudd, 1 lap down
 26-Brett Bodine, 1 lap down
 8-Dick Trickle, 2 laps down
 15-Geoff Bodine, 2 laps down
 94-Terry Labonte, 2 laps down
 3-Dale Earnhardt, 2 laps down

At a place where history was reared, Elliott put his name in the record books. In dramatic fashion, Elliott outran hard-charging Gant to post his fourth consecutive victory, tying the modern-era record for most successive wins.  Ironically, it was Gant who completed the feat just in September 1991. Mark Martin was third and Ricky Rudd fifth. Allison remained consistent with a fourth-place showing, giving him a 48-point lead over Elliott. Harry Gant was also consistent in the early part of the season, as he sat just 53 points behind Allison.

Food City 500 

The Food City 500 was held April 5 at Bristol International Raceway. Alan Kulwicki won the pole.

Top ten results

 7-Alan Kulwicki
 18-Dale Jarrett
 25-Ken Schrader
 94-Terry Labonte, 1 lap down
 8-Dick Trickle, 1 lap down
 5-Ricky Rudd, 3 laps down
 21-Morgan Shepherd, 4 laps down
 12-Hut Stricklin, 5 laps down
 2-Rusty Wallace, 6 laps down
 10-Derrike Cope, 6 laps down

Failed to qualify:
98-Jimmy Spencer

Coach Joe Gibbs started 0–5 as head coach over the Washington Redskins. As car owner of the Interstate Batteries Chevrolet driven by Dale Jarrett, Gibbs was again 0–5. But, as he did in football, Gibbs appeared headed for victory in his sixth try. Jarrett led the late stages of the event, but on lap 474 of the 500-lap event, Kulwicki used lapped traffic to maneuver around Jarrett and post his first victory of 1992.
Meanwhile, points leader Allison hit the wall separating the cartilage around his rib cage and knocking two vertebrae out of place and finished 28th. Elliott finished 20th and Allison's points lead was 29 over Elliott and 61 over Gant who finished 29th due to an engine failure after 277 laps.
Bill Elliott experienced trouble during the race, finishing 30 laps down in 20th.
This was the last asphalt race at Bristol International Raceway.  After the race ended, the blacktop was torn up and a new concrete surface was laid down.
Rusty Wallace earned his first Top 10 finish in what would be a very difficult season for the 1989 NASCAR Winston Cup Series champion.

First Union 400 

The First Union 400 was held April 12 at North Wilkesboro Speedway. Alan Kulwicki won the pole.

Top ten results

 28-Davey Allison
 2-Rusty Wallace
 5-Ricky Rudd
 15-Geoff Bodine
 33-Harry Gant
 3-Dale Earnhardt
 7-Alan Kulwicki
 22-Sterling Marlin
 94-Terry Labonte
 26-Brett Bodine

Failed to qualify: 32-Jimmy Horton, 9-Dave Mader III*, 48-James Hylton.

In one of the grittiest runs of the year, Allison overcame excruciating pain to collect his second win of the season. The pain was so overwhelming, Jimmy Hensley was called to qualify the Texaco Ford. He gave Davey a seventh-place starting position. Wearing a flak jacket and using an electrode-shock apparatus to help ease the pain, Allison held off a stiff challenge from Rusty Wallace and expanded his points lead to 86 over Gant, 106 over Elliott, 116 over Terry Labonte and 123 over Kulwicki.
Prior to the race, a special tribute was held for Junior Johnson, a native of nearby Wilkesboro, North Carolina. Incidentally, both of his drivers would fall short of victory lane, as in addition to Sterling Marlin's 8th place finish; Bill Elliott (driving the #11 Budweiser Ford Thunderbird) finished in the middle of the pack at 20th place.
The day before the race saw ESPN broadcaster Benny Parsons, like Johnson a native of Wilkes County, North Carolina, marry his second wife Terri just shy of one year after the death of Parsons' wife Connie.

Hanes 500 

The Hanes 500 was held April 26 at Martinsville Speedway. Darrell Waltrip won the pole. 

Top ten results

 6-Mark Martin
 22-Sterling Marlin
 17-Darrell Waltrip, 1 lap down
 94-Terry Labonte, 1 lap down
 33-Harry Gant, 2 laps down
 21-Morgan Shepherd, 2 laps down
 25-Ken Schrader, 2 laps down
 26-Brett Bodine, 2 laps down
 3-Dale Earnhardt, 3 laps down
 11-Bill Elliott, 3 laps down

Scheduling conflicts with ESPN's coverage of the 1992 NFL Draft meant they were unable to carry the race live, forcing ESPN to air the race on tape the next day, the last time a NASCAR race was not carried live.
This will long be remembered as "Camber Day". With new trick rear ends tilted slightly to help get a better drive through the corners, one leader after another fell to the wayside with broken rear axles. First to be victimized was then-dominating Kulwicki, followed by Dale Earnhardt and Ernie Irvan-all in the final 50 laps. With 10 laps remaining, Brett Bodine assumed the lead, until his rear axle broke, leaving Mark Martin standing. Martin's rear axle withstood the strain a few more laps and came out victorious, his first win in 1992. Sterling Marlin posted a second-place finish, followed by Darrell Waltrip, Labonte and Gant. Allison suffered another spin and crash, re injuring his rib cage, but he held a scant 16 point lead over Gant, who finished 5th. Terry Labonte was a surprising 3rd in points, just 41 points out of the lead. Also Dick Trickle was 9th at this time. Reigning Winston Cup champion Dale Earnhardt was 7th overall, while Mark Martin was down in 10th even after his win. 1991 points runner-up Ricky Rudd was 11th, Ken Schrader 14th, Rusty Wallace 16th, and Darrell Waltrip sat 17th in points.

Winston 500 

The Winston 500 was held May 3 at Talladega Superspeedway. Ernie Irvan won the pole. 

Top ten results

 28-Davey Allison
 11-Bill Elliott
 3-Dale Earnhardt
 22-Sterling Marlin
 4-Ernie Irvan
 7-Alan Kulwicki
 18-Dale Jarrett
 6-Mark Martin
 21-Morgan Shepherd
 42-Kyle Petty

Failed to qualify:
0-Delma Cowart, 23-Eddie Bierschwale, 48-James Hylton, 73-Phil Barkdoll, 77-Mike Potter

This was Buddy Baker's 700th and final Grand National/Winston Cup start. He would later attempt but fail to qualify for the 1993 DieHard 500, and at Daytona and Atlanta in 1994.
Davey Allison's resiliency was evident again. Coming off his second crash of the season, Allison held off Elliott by two car lengths in one of the most exciting finishes of the year. Everyone teamed up against Allison for a final shot coming out of the Talladega tri-oval. Chevrolet teammates Ernie Irvan and Dale Earnhardt on the right and Junior Johnson teammates Elliott and Sterling Marlin on the left. But Allison held them off for his second consecutive Winston 500 victory. The win made Allison the only remaining contender for the Winston Million. He had claimed two of the legs required to claim the $1 million bonus from Winston-the Daytona 500 and Winston 500. He would have two shots at the bonus, Charlotte and Darlington.
The #98 Chevrolet of Jimmy Spencer had a spectacular crash late in race on the backstretch.  After contact in the middle of the backstretch from the #16 Ford of Wally Dallenbach Jr., the #98 spun and became airborne (almost completely vertical).  Luckily, the car came back down on all 4 wheels without flipping over.  However, the suspension broke in the car as a result of the landing.
Davey Allison led Bill Elliott by 67 points.
Richard Petty finished 15th; which would later be tied with June's Miller Genuine Draft 400 at Michigan and the DieHard 500 at Talladega for the best finishes of his farewell season.

The Winston Open 
The Winston Open, a last chance race to qualify for The Winston, was held on May 16, 1992, at Charlotte Motor Speedway. Brett Bodine win the pole.

The Winston 
The 1992 edition of The Winston, took place on May 16, 1992. Davey Allison won the pole.

Criteria to qualify 
 All active 1991 and 1992 race winning drivers.
 All active 1991 and 1992 race winning car owners.
 All active former Winston Cup Champions.
 Top 2 finishers from The Winston Open

Lights were installed at Charlotte Motor Speedway, and it became the first non-short track to host night racing. The lights debuted for this popular exhibition "all star" event, The Winston on Saturday night, May 16.
In a race nicknamed "One Hot Night," Davey Allison won in shocking fashion. During the final 10-lap sprint, Dale Earnhardt led Kyle Petty and Davey Allison. On the final lap, Petty nudged Earnhardt in turn three, spinning him out. Petty took the lead into turn four, but as he entered the qual-oval, Davey Allison pulled alongside. The two cars touched as they crossed the finish line, with Allison edging out Petty by less than half a car length. The two cars clipped, and Allison crashed hard into the outside wall, showering bright sparks over the track. Allison spent the night in the hospital instead of victory lane.

Coca-Cola 600 

The Coca-Cola 600 was held Sunday, May 24 at Charlotte Motor Speedway. The #11 of Bill Elliott won the pole.

All eyes focused on Allison, as he was recovering from his injuries the previous weekend during The Winston. Allison spent two days in the hospital, nursing a broken collarbone, re-injured ribs, and bruises covering 60% of his body. After winning at Daytona and Talladega, Allison was eligible for the Winston Million if he was victorious at Charlotte. Allison had won the Coca-Cola 600 in 1991, and Charlotte was considered Robert Yates's best track.
In the late stages, Kyle Petty and Ernie Irvan battled for 1st-2nd. Dale Earnhardt was running third, about 3 seconds behind. After the final round of pit stops (laps 345-346), Dale Earnhardt moved in front of both Kyle Petty and Ernie Irvan to post his first - and only - win of 1992. Allison finished fourth in his bid for the $1 million bonus. Allison still had one more chance to win the Winston Million, later in the season at Darlington.
This was the first victory of the season for GM, as all races up to this point have been won by Fords.
The Coca-Cola 600 would be Dale Earnhardt's lone victory of 1992 (with the exception of the Gatorade 125 qualifier at Daytona). Approaching his final green-flag pit stop, Earnhardt trailed by 3 seconds, but emerged with a 1.5-second lead, prompting several of his competitors to believe that Earnhardt broke the 55 mph pit road speed limit while exiting. No penalty was assessed.
This would be the final Coca-Cola 600 scheduled to run during the daytime. Starting in 1993, the race was moved to a late afternoon/night race.
Davey Allison led 33 laps after starting 17th. Polesitter Bill Elliott failed to lead any laps (Ricky Rudd led the first lap from 3rd) en route to a 14th-place finish, 4 laps down. Elliott was now 111 points behind, closely followed by Harry Gant, Alan Kulwicki, and Dale Earnhardt.
Jimmy Spencer finished 27th in this in what would be the last race for Travis Carter Enterprises until the 1994 Daytona 500.

Budweiser 500 

The Budweiser 500 was held May 31 at Dover Downs International Speedway. The #26 driven by Brett Bodine won the pole. 

Top ten results

 33-Harry Gant
 3-Dale Earnhardt
 2-Rusty Wallace, 1 lap down
 4-Ernie Irvan, 1 lap down
 17-Darrell Waltrip, 1 lap down
 5-Ricky Rudd, 2 laps down
 12-Hut Stricklin, 2 laps down
 66-Jimmy Hensley, 2 laps down
 8-Dick Trickle, 2 laps down
 21-Morgan Shepherd, 2 laps down

Harry Gant could not outduel the field, so he outfueled them en route to his first victory of '92. While other drivers were forced to pit late for fuel, Gant stretched his to the absolute limit and beat Darrell Waltrip in a fuel mileage war. His final pit stop was on lap 403, and Darrell Waltrip's last stop was on lap 406. But Waltrip was the one who ran out of fuel (with a lap and one half remaining), while Gant ran out on the backstretch on lap 500 with a one lap lead. Dale Earnhardt passed him in turns 3 and 4 to unlap himself and finish 26 seconds behind Gant. Third was Rusty Wallace and fourth for Ernie Irvan. Points leader Allison was never a contender, finishing 11th, while Elliott was 13th. Allison's point lead dwindled to 70 points over Gant and just 99 over Earnhardt.
This race would be the first time radial tires were used at Dover.

Save Mart Supermarkets 300K 

The Save Mart Supermarkets 300K was held June 7 at Sears Point Raceway. For the third consecutive year in this event Ricky Rudd won the pole.

Top ten results

 4-Ernie Irvan
 94-Terry Labonte
 6-Mark Martin
 5-Ricky Rudd
 11-Bill Elliott
 3-Dale Earnhardt
 2-Rusty Wallace
 17-Darrell Waltrip
 25-Ken Schrader
 15-Geoff Bodine

On the day of this race, NASCAR founder Bill France Sr. died.
Ernie Irvan started 2nd in this race, but jumped the start and was given a stop-and-go penalty in the pits. Irvan came through the entire field to win in the fastest Winston Cup race held on the  version of Sears Point. Irvan forged one of the most astonishing comebacks in NASCAR history. Irvan, qualifying second, was black-flagged for jumping the start of the race, relegating him to dead last on a road course with road course demons Rusty Wallace, Ricky Rudd and Terry Labonte leading the field. Irvan blazed through the backmarkers, picked off the middle of the pack, then steadily reeled in leader Labonte with 10 laps remaining. Finally, on lap 67 of the 74-lap event, Irvan retook the top spot and drove on to a 3.6-second win. Irvan dedicated the race to Bill France Sr., the founder of NASCAR who died the morning of the race.
Points leader Davey Allison had a terrible day. He spun into a tire barrier early in the race, and later spun in front of the leaders while trying to get out of the way. His 28th-place finish (last car 1 lap down) tightened up the points race in favor of Dale Earnhardt, Bill Elliott, and Harry Gant, who now trailed by 28, 31 and 32 points respectively.
Richard Petty's 21st-place finish made him the last car on the lead lap, the final race where he would finish on the lead lap.

Champion Spark Plug 500 

The Champion Spark Plug 500 was held June 14 at Pocono Raceway. Ken Schrader won the pole.

Top ten results

 7-Alan Kulwicki
 6-Mark Martin
 11-Bill Elliott
 25-Ken Schrader
 28-Davey Allison
 42-Kyle Petty
 22-Sterling Marlin
 26-Brett Bodine
 66-Jimmy Hensley
 94-Terry Labonte

Alan Kulwicki overcame a charging Mark Martin and a brush with danger while passing a lapped car in the final 15 laps to notch his second '92 win. Kulwicki nearly drove into the wall on the backstretch with 12 laps remaining while passing lapped traffic, yielding the lead to Elliott. But with 10 laps to go, Kulwicki blew by Elliott for a lead he would never again relinquish. Martin also moved by Elliott in the final five laps for second. 
In what would be the beginning of a rough mid-season string of mechanical troubles, Dale Earnhardt developed motor issues that dropped him back to 28th finishing position and fifth in the points.
Davey Allison's points lead continued to dwindle, as Bill Elliott chopped off another 10 points with 21 remaining. Alan Kulwicki's win reduced his deficit to Allison to just 58 points, as he also led the most laps (58 of 200).
This would be Alan Kulwicki's last win. 1992 was also the only year in which Kulwicki won twice.
This would be the last points race win in the Cup Series for car number 7 until July 17th, 1994 when Geoff Bodine won the 1994 Miller Genuine Draft 500 at Pocono

Miller Genuine Draft 400 

The Miller Genuine Draft 400 was held June 21 at Michigan International Speedway. Davey Allison won the pole. 

Top ten results

 28-Davey Allison
 17-Darrell Waltrip
 7-Alan Kulwicki
 42-Kyle Petty
 5-Ricky Rudd
 6-Mark Martin
 33-Harry Gant
 55-Ted Musgrave, 1 lap down
 3-Dale Earnhardt, 1 lap down
 11-Bill Elliott, 1 lap down

After four wrecks and a plethora of misfortune, Allison was up to his old tricks — flat out dominating. Allison guided his Texaco Ford to an easy victory at Michigan, his fourth of the '92 season. By winning from the pole he received the bonus money for the position that boosted his winnings to $150,665. Darrell Waltrip and Kulwicki ran in the top five all day and finished second and third, respectively. Allison padded his points lead to 67 over Elliott and 73 over Kulwicki.
Michael Waltrip, driving the #30 Pennzoil Pontiac Grand Prix, was injured in a crash in first round qualifying on June 19; with Ben Hess attempting to qualify on the day before the race in second round qualifying only for Hess to crash at about the same spot; forcing Waltrip to take a provisional to start the race. Waltrip started the race but was still hampered by the injuries and was eventually relieved by Hess.
Final time where Davey Allison wins from the pole.
This was the last ever 2nd place finish for Darrell Waltrip.

Indianapolis Motor Speedway test 
On the way home from Michigan, on June 22–23, nine top NASCAR Winston Cup series teams were invited to Indianapolis to participate in a Goodyear tire test. Although no official announcements were made, it was in fact an unofficial feasibility test to see if stock cars would be competitive at the circuit (see 1994 Brickyard 400). An estimated 10,000 spectators watched a rather exciting two days of history in the making. A. J. Foyt took a few laps around the track in Dale Earnhardt's car on the second day. ESPN covered the test.

Pepsi 400 

The Pepsi 400 was held Saturday, July 4 at Daytona International Speedway. Sterling Marlin won the pole position, and Richard Petty qualified second, in his final race at Daytona.

This race was attended by President George H. W. Bush and he served as the grand marshal.
A special ceremony was held during the pre-race festivities, honoring Richard Petty's final race at Daytona. Petty had spent time before the race testing at Daytona, in hopes that he might win the pole position and possibly be a factor in the race. He held the provisional pole for quite some time, and ultimately qualified second. At the start, Petty whipped the capacity crowd into a frenzy when he led the first five laps (the final laps led of his long career). He dropped out in 36th due to heat-related fatigue. A futile effort was made for Eddie Bierschwale to take over the #43 car and bring it to the finish, but he lasted only a couple laps.
The race became a battle between Ernie Irvan, Sterling Marlin, Dale Jarrett, Geoff Bodine and Bill Elliott. Irvan held off a furious charge by Marlin and Jarrett by two car lengths.
Frustration increased for Dale Earnhardt, now-midway through what would turn out to be his worst Winston Cup season. He was the first car out, suffering engine failure, dropping him 252 points behind points leader Allison, who still held a 46-point lead over Elliott.
The race went 109 laps before the first caution, and was on-pace for a record average speed until a crash on lap 129 (of 160) slowed the pace. The average speed of 170.457 mph stood as the fastest restrictor plate at Daytona race until 1998.
The enigmatic "Daytona Tsunami", a nine foot rogue wave, occurred the night before at the beach with some injuries being reported.
This race marked career start number 400 for Harry Gant, he would finish in 23rd, 2 laps down to the winner
This race marked career start number 700 for Dave Marcis, he would blow an engine completing 130 of 160 laps finishing 32nd.

Miller Genuine Draft 500 
The Miller Genuine Draft 500 was held July 19 at Pocono Raceway. Davey Allison won the pole.

Top ten results

 17-Darrell Waltrip
 33-Harry Gant
 7-Alan Kulwicki
 5-Ricky Rudd
 55-Ted Musgrave
 6-Mark Martin
 42-Kyle Petty
 26-Brett Bodine
 8-Dick Trickle
 18-Dale Jarrett

This race changed the outcome of the 1992 NASCAR Winston Cup season. Allison had set a new track record during his pole run, then totally dominated the first 140 laps. An air wrench broke during yellow flag pit stops, putting Allison in seventh for the lap 146 restart. He moved quickly up to fourth on lap 148. Allison's day took a turn for the worse a lap later when he and Darrell Waltrip tangled while jockeying for position exiting turn 2, sending Allison spinning. The air got under Allison's car and sent it into a frightening barrel along the top of the inside guardrail. The car flipped 11 times, eventually landing upside down with gasoline leaking from the rear, completely demolished. Allison suffered a broken right forearm, a dislocated wrist, a skull fracture and a severe concussion. Waltrip drove to victory, and Allison was hospitalized in Pennsylvania for four days. The severity of the crash was such that when Mark Martin drove by, he told his crew, "They may as well get a body bag for Davey."
Elliott finished 13th, but took over the points lead for the first time of the year. Allison, his immediate future unknown, now trailed by 9 points, while Alan Kulwicki (-47 points) and Harry Gant (-80 points) continued to stay within reach..
The first thing Darrell Waltrip wanted to know after he won was whether or not Davey was okay.
Last career pole for Davey Allison.
Richard Petty, in his final race at Pocono, qualified 7th and advanced as high as 5th place early in the race before finishing 20th, 1 lap down.
Dale Earnhardt's engine problems continued as his team had to change engines shortly before the race started. The two-time defending champion qualified 29th and finished 23rd.

DieHard 500 

The DieHard 500 was held July 26 at Talladega Superspeedway in Talladega, Alabama. Sterling Marlin won the pole. 

Top ten results

 4-Ernie Irvan
 22-Sterling Marlin
 28-Davey Allison/Bobby Hillin Jr.
 5-Ricky Rudd, 1 lap down
 11-Bill Elliott, 1 lap down
 42-Kyle Petty, 1 lap down
 30-Michael Waltrip, 1 lap down
 9-Chad Little, 1 lap down
 25-Ken Schrader, 1 lap down
 26-Brett Bodine, 1 lap down

In awe-inspiring fashion, Allison walked into the garage area at Talladega, determined to put on his uniform and drive in the DieHard 500 after suffering the skull fracture the previous week at Pocono. With a tailor-made cast, a wrist brace and velcro on the shifter, Allison started the race and gained the all-important Winston Cup points. After 6 laps during the 1st caution, backup driver 1986 winner Bobby Hillin Jr. took over the wheel and nearly drove the Texaco Ford to victory. Irvan and Marlin again battled for superspeedway supremacy with Irvan nipping the winless Marlin by a scant .19 seconds. Earnhardt had engine failure again and finished dead last for the second time in three races, taking him out of contention for a third consecutive Winston Cup title.
The race only saw two yellows, at lap 6 and lap 70. The long green runs caused the field to spread out, and the strongest cars in the field (the 4, 22, and 28) lapped everyone else.
Ernie Irvan suffered a flat tire on lap 5. When the yellow came out, he sped out of the pits to stay on the lead lap, but failed to beat leader Ricky Rudd to the line and was penalized to the rear of the field for speeding. He went on to pass everyone and get his lap back, and when the second (and only other) caution came out, he made up his lost lap.
Thanks to a great 3rd place finish by relief driver Bobby Hillin Jr., Davey Allison leapfrogged Bill Elliott by 1 point to re-take the lead. Alan Kulwicki (who finished 3 laps down in 25th) and Harry Gant (2 laps down in 17th) fell to a deficit of 120 and 129 points respectively.
After his engine failed, Earnhardt was briefly waiting in position as a possible substitute driver for Richard Petty; though ultimately Petty's final race in Talladega would see "the King" finish the race behind his famed #43.
Chad Little's 9th place finish was the 2nd and final Top 10 finish for Melling Racing in 1992; with the only other Top 10 for the team being the season-opening Daytona 500; when the #9 (then driven by Phil Parsons) finished in 10th place.

Budweiser at The Glen 

The Budweiser at The Glen was held August 9 at Watkins Glen International. Dale Earnhardt won the pole. The race was shortened to 51 laps due to rain as NASCAR did not have rain tires to use at the time; this would change at the 2020 Bank of America Roval 400.

Top ten results

 42-Kyle Petty
 21-Morgan Shepherd
 4-Ernie Irvan
 6-Mark Martin
 16-Wally Dallenbach Jr.
 2-Rusty Wallace
 7-Alan Kulwicki
 94-Terry Labonte
 3-Dale Earnhardt
 26-Brett Bodine

This was the first race for Winston Cup cars since the new bus stop chicane was added in light of J. D. McDuffie's fatal accident in 1991. Nifty pit strategy and Mother Nature helped Kyle Petty notch the first (and only) road course victory of his career. Rain pushed back the start of the race more than three hours, and once the green flag finally fell, it was fairly evident it would be a sprint to the halfway point. Petty won a heated battle for the lead with Ernie Irvan between laps 32–36, a pivotal point in the race. After a caution, the race was restarted on lap 44, one lap before the halfway point, which would make the race official regardless of the weather. Petty brushed off then-leader Dick Trickle on lap 45 and on lap 46, the skies opened. After five laps under caution, the race was red-flagged, then called with Petty as the winner.

Still suffering from his Pocono injuries, Davey Allison fell 17 points behind 14th-place finisher Bill Elliott, after Dorsey Schroeder relieved Davey mid-race and finished 20th. Alan Kulwicki's solid finish reduced his interval to 94 points, while Harry Gant made no progress, finishing 18th and increasing his deficit to 140 points. Kyle Petty climbed up to 9th in points, tied with Morgan Shepherd at 340 points behind Elliott.

This was Todd Bodine's first Winston Cup race. He drove a Ford Thunderbird bearing his Busch Series car number (34), as well as sponsorship by Diet Pepsi.

Champion Spark Plug 400 

The Champion Spark Plug 400 was held August 16 at Michigan International Speedway.  The #7 of Alan Kulwicki won the pole.

Top ten results

 33-Harry Gant
 17-Darrell Waltrip
 11-Bill Elliott
 4-Ernie Irvan
 28-Davey Allison
 42-Kyle Petty
 22-Sterling Marlin
 18-Dale Jarrett
 6-Mark Martin
 21-Morgan Shepherd

The physical pain Davey Allison endured could not have prepared him for the emotional anguish the Alabama native would suffer through this weekend. On Thursday during Busch Grand National practice, Davey's younger brother, Clifford, died as the result of a single-car crash in turn three. The entire racing family mourned for the Allisons. Davey decided to race. He qualified third and finished fifth in a courageous effort.
 Harry Gant won another fuel mileage war, beating Darrell Waltrip and Elliott to the finish line by nearly five seconds.
This was Harry Gant's last Winston Cup victory. He set a new record for oldest winner of a Winston Cup race at 52 years and 219 days. This was also Oldsmobile's last victory in NASCAR.
The final caution came out on lap 97 for a turn 2 accident involving Jimmy Hensley, Rick Mast, Jeff McClure, and eliminating Derrike Cope. Midpack runner Harry Gant pitted while the leaders (Bill Elliott, Ernie Irvan, and Davey Allison) stayed out, not believing they could finish the race on one more pit stop. They had pitted under the previous caution when Lake Speed spun and severed a fuel line. Gant pitted under green at lap 149 and stayed out until the checkered flag waved.
Bill Elliott's point lead grew from 17 to 37 after he led a race-high 72 of 200 laps. Harry Gant shaved 5 points from his deficit to Elliott (down to 135). Polesitter Alan Kulwicki faded to 14th, 1 lap down, after leading 46 laps. This lackluster result put him 143 points behind.
What had been a frustrating second half of 1992 continued for Dale Earnhardt; who was forced to start from the back of the field after failing inspection during the second round of qualifying. Earnhardt would finish 16th in the race.

Bud 500 
The Bud 500 was held Saturday night, August 29 at Bristol International Raceway. The #4 of Ernie Irvan won the pole.

This was the first race at Bristol after the track was re-surfaced with concrete.
Darrell Waltrip, the winningest driver in history at Bristol, won for the 12th (and final) time at the popular track. Waltrip out-dueled Dale Earnhardt and Ken Schrader in one of the most exciting races of the season. Davey Allison was running fifth when he lost control and hit the wall. After extensive repairs, Allison rejoined the race, only to crash into the inside wall on the frontstretch. He dropped out and finished 30th. Elliott was steady with a sixth-place finish.
Darrell Waltrip won this race four days after the birth of his second daughter, Sarah.
On lap 8 polesitter Ernie Irvan spun on the backstretch and backed into the pit wall after leading the first 7 laps. He lost more than 100 laps and eventually parked the car after completing 285 laps, finishing a disappointing 28th.
Among the points contenders, Bill Elliott had the cleanest day, finishing 6th. Harry Gant, Mark Martin, and Davey Allison all dropped out from crashes. Kyle Petty and Alan Kulwicki received minor damage in separate incidents, but both continued and posted top-5 finishes. Bill Elliott gained significant ground, stretching his lead to 109 points over Davey Allison.

Mountain Dew Southern 500 
The Mountain Dew Southern 500 was held September 6 at Darlington Raceway.  The #22 of Sterling Marlin won the pole position. This race was shortened to 298 laps of 367 due to rain.

The attention largely focused on Davey Allison, who was eligible for the Winston Million, and could also claim a Career Grand Slam by winning all four majors in his career. Cloudy skies and rain were in the forecast, but the race started on time and cruised well beyond the halfway point before rain entered the area. As the race progressed, Allison ran in the top three most of the day, and was in contention for victory, and the coveted Winston Million bonus.
Allison's biggest challenges, however, were impending rain, and hard-charging Mark Martin. Allison pitted first on lap 286 of the 367-lap event. Martin, pitting on the backstretch, came in on lap 289. Just moments later on lap 295, the skies opened and the rain that had threatened all day finally came. Darrell Waltrip, Bill Elliott, and Brett Bodine were among a handful of drivers who had not yet pitted. When the red flag was displayed on lap 298, Waltrip was scored as the leader, having taken the lead on lap 293. Shortly thereafter, the race was called and Waltrip was declared the winner. It was Waltrip's second consecutive win, but more importantly, his first Southern 500 victory, making him the fourth driver to finish off the Career Grand Slam. Martin was second, with points contender Elliott coming home a surprising third. Allison was shuffled back to 5th.
A dejected Allison lost his chance at the Winston Million, however he did win the $100,000 bonus from Winston for winning two out of four crown jewel races. Allison also lost ground to Elliott in the season standings. Elliott now led by 119 points over Allison. Alan Kulwicki was still in striking distance at 161 points behind.
Larry McReynolds wrote in his 2002 autobiography, The Big Picture: My Life from Pit Road to the Broadcast Booth about the pit miscue for Allison. He sent a crew member to the NASCAR hauler to look at the weather radar (teams looked at the radar from NASCAR's hauler, unlike modern pit boxes with a connection to the radar), and the crew member gave McReynolds the call to pit the car on lap 286. According to the book, the crew member said "Green means good," with McReynolds responding, "Green means rain." This incident heavily influenced McReynolds when he went to broadcasting, even making an appearance on The Weather Channel after going to broadcasting in 2001.
In the thick of the 1992 election season, Bill Clinton was the grand marshal for this race.
This was Darrell Waltrip's 84th and final Winston Cup victory. 
Final time in his career as well that Darrell Waltrip would win multiple races in a season.
First time since 1983 (and final time in his career) that Darrell Waltrip won back-to-back races in a season.
Dale Earnhardt would once again be plagued with mechanical issues, this time problems with the clutch early. The clutch would be fixed; but Earnhardt would finish in 29th place, 57 laps down and the lowest finishing car still running in the race.

Miller Genuine Draft 400 
The Miller Genuine Draft 400 was held Saturday night, September 12 at Richmond International Raceway. The #4 of Ernie Irvan won the pole.

Rusty Wallace was driving for newly acquired crew chief Buddy Parrott. Wallace led the final 139 laps and beat Mark Martin by 3.59 seconds for the win. Darrell Waltrip's hot streak ended at two wins, but he followed it up here with a third-place finish.
Points leader Bill Elliott struggled home 14th a lap down, Alan Kulwicki finished 15th, while Davey Allison spun twice and finished 19th. Elliott's points grew to 124 over Allison, and 164 over Kulwicki.

Peak Antifreeze 500 
The Peak Antifreeze 500 was held September 20 at Dover Downs International Speedway. The #7 of Alan Kulwicki won the pole. 

Points leader Bill Elliott returned to his dominating ways, but late pit stop strategy cost him the victory. While battling Ricky Rudd for the lead, Elliott pitted first, taking on four tires and fuel. Rudd pitted for fuel only, and came out of the pits with a 9-second lead over Elliott. Rudd held on to beat Elliott to the finish line by 0.5 seconds, his only victory of the season.
Ricky Rudd's victory kept his streak alive of consecutive seasons with at least one victory – extending it to ten.
Bill Elliott led the most laps and extended his point lead over Davey Allison to 154 points, the highest margin of the season. Harry Gant was third, 239 points behind Elliott. Polesitter Alan Kulwicki crashed out of the race on lap 91, finishing 34th and leaving him 278 points out of the lead with six races left.

Goody's 500 
The Goody's 500 was held Monday, September 28 at Martinsville Speedway. Kyle Petty won the pole. Rain delayed the race from Sunday until Monday.

The previous day's rain left the infield very soggy.
Spirited battles throughout the field were the order of the day as the cold and humidity led to slick racing conditions. Geoff Bodine emerged through the constant melees to his first win for owner Bud Moore.
Kyle Petty, who finished 4th, actually got stuck in the mud and lost 2 laps at one point.
Bill Elliott finished 30th as a result of engine failure after 158 laps. Davey Allison finished 4 laps down in 16th, not gaining much but reducing Elliott's lead to 112 points.
Dale Earnhardt would finish in last place for the third time this season; and like the Pepsi 400 and DieHard 500 the cause was the same, as like Bill Elliott, Earnhardt's exit was due to a blown engine.

Tyson Holly Farms 400 

The Tyson Holly Farms 400 was held Monday, October 5 at North Wilkesboro Speedway. The #7 of Alan Kulwicki won the pole. This race was postponed to Monday as a result of rain (the second week in a row that this occurred).

In a complete contrast from the previous week, the result was the same. Geoff Bodine recorded his second consecutive win, but in the caution- and incident-free Holly Farms 400. Bodine led the final 144 laps and lapped everyone except runner-up Mark Martin. He lapped Winston Cup points leader Bill Elliott eight times under green. Bodine's victory, in the Ford car, clinched the first manufacturer's championship for Ford Motor Co. since 1969; it was also the first time a brand other than a General Motors product won the manufacturer's title since Dodge won it in 1975.
Due to the race running caution-free (very strange for a short track), only 2 cars finished on the lead lap. However, Geoff Bodine won by only 5.3 seconds. As of 2018, this would be the last time ever that a NASCAR short track event race would go flag to flag green (or caution-free). In 2017, NASCAR would make a 3 stages format for every race of the season, and at a certain lap at the end of each stage, they would throw the caution flag, thus making it that a race can no longer go flag to flag green (or caution-free).
Bill Elliott stubbed his toe again with another poor finish. He was 8 laps down in 26th at Junior Johnson's home track. Davey Allison was 3 laps down in 11th, and he continued to gain on Elliott as he sat 67 points behind with 4 races to go.

Mello Yello 500 

The Mello Yello 500 was held October 11 at Charlotte Motor Speedway. Alan Kulwicki won the pole. 

Mark Martin charged past mid-race dominator Kyle Petty in the late stages, then held off Kulwicki in the final 50 laps to post what he called "the most important victory of his career." Martin led 107 laps en route to his second win of the season, which suddenly vaulted him back in contention for the 1992 Winston Cup title.
The #31 Team Ireland Chevrolet of Bobby Hillin Jr. was disqualified due to illegal cylinder heads after finishing 15th. As a result, the team withdrew from the series in an attempt to avoid being drawn into disrepute. It would the last time a Cup driver was disqualified for illegal parts until NASCAR introduced a new disqualification policy for technical inspection failures in 2019.
Bill Elliott's sway bar broke after 310 laps, leaving Bill with a 30th-place finish. Junior Johnson entered a third car driven by Hut Stricklin, who retired the car when Elliott had his problem. Stricklin's 31st-place finish saved Elliott 3 points. Davey Allison didn't have a great day, either; he was 5 laps down in 19th.
Last career pole for Alan Kulwicki. Kulwicki would finish 2nd despite breaking a gearbox that forced him to finish the race in 4th gear. Kulwicki would use a similar strategy following a gearbox failure at the 1992 Hooters 500 at the end of the season.

AC Delco 500 

The AC Delco 500 was held October 25 at North Carolina Speedway. Kyle Petty won the pole.

In the most dominating performance of the season, Kyle Petty continued his sensational second half of 1992 with a convincing AC-Delco 500 win. Petty led all but eight of the 492 laps in his father's final race in North Carolina. He only relinquished the lead during green flag pit stops. The outcome was never in doubt, so the attention moved to the points battle, which marched into Rockingham with six drivers in contention. After Petty's Victory Lane celebration, those six still remained in the title picture, with Elliott leading by 70 over Allison, 85 over Kulwicki, 94 over Petty and 113 over Gant.
Kyle Petty led 484 of 492 laps. Mark Martin (before he crashed) and Bill Elliott led 3 laps each, and Ernie Irvan led 2 during green flag pit stops. As a result of the domination and only 2 cautions in a 500-mile (805 km) race, only 2 cars finished on the lead lap. Despite the green flag look of the race, Petty beat Irvan by just under a second.
Only time in his career that Kyle Petty won multiple races in a season.
Bill Elliott finally had a good finish after 3 successive finishes of 26th or worse.
For this race and the following week's Pyroil 500K, TNN had a promotion as part of their encouraging viewers to vote in the 1992 elections, where viewers could call a 1-800 number and respond which of the drivers contending for the 1992 Winston Cup championship would win.

Pyroil 500K 

The Pyroil 500K was held November 1 at Phoenix International Raceway. The #2 of Rusty Wallace won the pole. 

Smoke billowed from Elliott's Budweiser Ford, signaling an opportunity for the rest of the Winston Cup contenders. Allison and Kulwicki took full advantage. While Elliott's car suffered from a cracked cylinder head and overheating problems, which relegated him to a 31st-place finish, Allison patiently made his way to the front and won his second consecutive Pyroil 500. The emotional victory — Allison's first since the Pocono accident (and penultimate), vaulted him back into the points lead. Kulwicki ran strong all day and finished fourth, also moving him past Elliott in the point standings. Heading into the season's final event at Atlanta Motor Speedway, Allison led Kulwicki by 30 points, Elliott by 40, Gant by 97, Petty by 98 and Martin by 113. It was the first time in the sport's history that six drivers were still in contention heading into the final event.
Rusty Wallace led 161 laps but had to go to the garage area (finishing 28th); during his stay a reporter for TNN asked him a question and Wallace caustically grabbed his microphone into the cockpit to answer.
Last race without Jeff Gordon in the field until the 2016 Daytona 500.
Final time in his career as well that Davey Allison would win multiple races in a season.
To mark Richard Petty's penultimate race, both of the cars sponsored by Skoal tobacco; Harry Gant's #33 Skoal Bandit Oldsmobile and Rick Mast's #1 Skoal Classic Oldsmobile sported "Thanks King Richard" messages on their quarterpanels and decklid.

Hooters 500 

The Hooters 500 was held November 15 at Atlanta Motor Speedway. Rick Mast won the pole.

In what is largely considered one of the greatest NASCAR races of all-time, six drivers entered the race with a mathematical chance to win the Winston Cup (Bill Elliott, Alan Kulwicki, Davey Allison, Kyle Petty, Harry Gant and Mark Martin). The race was the highly publicized final career start for 7-time NASCAR champion Richard Petty and, quietly, the first career start for future champion Jeff Gordon. Davey Allison had to finish 6th or better to automatically clinch the championship.
Rick Mast won his first career Winston Cup pole, but crashed out on lap 2 with Brett Bodine and did not lead any laps. Both cars hit the wall in turn one; Bodine spun to the apron and was hammered at full speed by a surprised Hut Stricklin. On lap 95, a multi-car crash ensued that collected Richard Petty. The crash knocked the oil cooler off the car and dumped oil on the King's engine, causing it to erupt in flames. Petty rolled to a stop next to a fire truck, which quickly extinguished the flames, but his return to the race looked very doubtful.
Championship contenders Mark Martin and Kyle Petty dropped out with engine trouble while Harry Gant faded and was not a factor in the second half.
On lap 254, Davey Allison's fate was sealed. While running 6th — good enough to clinch the title — and charging to the front, suddenly disaster struck. Ernie Irvan had a tire going down, lost control and spun directly in front of Rusty Wallace and Allison. Wallace dodged the spinning Irvan, but Allison was not so lucky. Irvan pancaked the wall and bounced off into Allison. Allison spun into the inside pit wall, and damaged the tirerod. His car still had power, and tried desperately to get his car rolling, but to no avail. The crash effectively ended his run at the championship and winning the race. Elliott and Kulwicki were left to battle for the title. Allison would eventually return to the track but several laps down.
Elliott and Kulwicki ran 1st-2nd for most of the second half, swapping the lead on several occasions. It became evident that the driver who led the most laps (receiving the 5 bonus points for leading the most laps) would clinch the championship. After the final gas-and-go pit stops, Kulwicki had led 103 laps. Elliott took over the lead, with Kulwicki settling into a comfortable second. Elliott led the rest of the way, his fifth victory of the season, bringing his laps led total to 102 laps, one short of Kulwicki's total — giving the 5 bonus points to Kulwicki.
Elliott won the Hooters 500, but Kulwicki's second-place finish allowed him to claim the 1992 NASCAR Winston Cup championship by a scant 10 points, the third-narrowest margin in the sport's history (after 2011, in which Tony Stewart and Carl Edwards finished tied, the title going to Stewart by virtue of more wins in the season, and Kurt Busch's 8 point margin over Jimmie Johnson in 2004). This would be the final time in his career that Bill Elliott would pull off the season sweep at a track. Meanwhile, the STP crew patched Richard Petty's car back together and "The King" rejoined the field with two laps to go and was running at the finish in his final race to receive the checkered flag.
Jeff Gordon started 21st and finished in 31st in his Winston Cup debut.

Final points standings 

(key) Bold - Pole position awarded by time. Italics - Pole position set by owner's points standings. *- Most laps led.

Other information 
Dale Earnhardt and Rusty Wallace both failed to finish in the top 10 in points for 1992. Earnhardt, who was the defending Winston Cup champion for the last 2 years (1990 and 1991), tried to join Cale Yarborough by winning 3 championships in a row, but he had a very disappointing season. He only scored one win, and he finished 12th in points. Wallace had a very disappointing season as well. He too scored only one win, and he finished 13th in points. The next season however, both Earnhardt and Wallace rebounded, and they finished 1st and 2nd in the standings. Earnhardt would win his 6th championship that year with 6 wins, and Wallace would finish 2nd with 10 wins. Earnhardt would win the championship by 80 points over Wallace.

Two cars numbered 24 were fielded during the season; Butch Gilliland used the number in a car owned by himself at Phoenix and Jeff Gordon drove the number 24 in his first race car with Hendrick Motorsports. The 1993 Winston Cup Series Media Guide shows that Butch Gilliland also fielded the #24 Aneheim Elect. Gear Pontiac in the Sonoma race in June 1992 finishing 38th after starting 36th.  However, as the Phoenix and Sonoma races were declared combination races with the Winston West Series would run joint races together, Gilliland was registered with the West Series, a developmental series since 2003.
This was the final year in NASCAR for the Oldsmobile brand.

Rookie of the Year 

Jimmy Hensley, driving Cale Yarborough's #66 Ford, was named Rookie of the Year after posting four top-ten finishes in 22 starts. Veteran Chad Little drove the car in the first six races, but was replaced by Bobby Hillin Jr. at North Wilkesboro and by Hensley in the following race at Martinsville. Hensley had previously never started more than 4 Winston Cup races in a season (doing so in 1984 and in 1991). Bob Schacht, Andy Belmont, and Dave Mader III were also declared for the award, but did not run enough races to compete for the award.

Further reading 
 Race with Destiny, David Poole. Albion Press (FL), April 15, 2002 . .

See also
1992 NASCAR Busch Series

References

External links 
 Winston Cup Standings and Statistics for 1992

 
NASCAR Cup Series seasons